Fuzhou, also known as Gandong, is a prefecture-level city in the northeastern part of Jiangxi province, People's Republic of China.

Fuzhou is located to the south of the provincial capital Nanchang, bordered in the east by Fujian Province. The population is 3,900,000. The area is located northwest of the Wuyi Mountains, and is drained by the Fu River (Fuhe), which flows northwest to the Poyang Lake (in the neighboring Nanchang Prefecture).

History

The area was part of Chu during the Warring States Period. After being conquered by the Qin, it was included in the Jiujiang Commandery.

In 204 BC, the territory was added to the Huainan Kingdom. Two years later, Yuzhang Commandery was dissociated from Huainan. Names of the counties Nancheng and Linru, both of which then part of Yuzhang, first appeared in this period.

In 257 AD, counties Linru and Nancheng were added to a new commandery, Linchuan. Thereafter they were divided to 10 counties including Linru, Nancheng, Xiping, Xinjian, Xicheng, Yihuang, Anpu, Nanfeng, Yongcheng, Dongxing, with the administration center in Linru County. In 522 AD, another new commandery, Bashan, was divided from Linchuan, administering 7 counties Xinjian, Xining, Bashan, Dafeng, Xin’an, Xingping, Fengcheng. Linchuan and Bashan belonged to Gao State in 557 AD. The two commanderies were replaced by Fu Prefecture (Fuzhou) in 589 AD.

Tang Dynasty and later
In 811 AD, Fuzhou was renamed as Shangzhou. In 975 AD, it was renamed as Junzhou. In 1149 AD, Le’an County was established in the prefecture, which administered counties Linchuan, Chongren, Yihuang, Jinxi and Le’an at that time. On June 23, 2000, Fuzhou City was officially established as a prefecture-level city in China.

Economy
The main industries in the area are food, textiles, food processing and light-modeled cars.

Administration 
Fuzhou has direct jurisdiction over two districts and nine counties:

Districts: 
 Linchuan District, the seat of the municipal government, CPC and Public Security bureaux and Intermediate People's Court.
 Dongxiang District

Counties:
 Nancheng County
 Nanfeng County
 Lichuan County
 Chongren County
 Le'an County
 Yihuang County
 Jinxi County
 Zixi County
 Guangchang County

Climate

Transportation
Nanchang-Fuzhou Express railway (major service in Linchuan district; additional service in Nancheng County and Nanfeng County)
Yingtan-Xiamen Railway (limited service, available in Zixi County only)
Hangzhou–Changsha High-Speed Railway: Fuzhou East Railway Station in Dongxiang District

Recent history
On 23 May 2010, a train traveling from Shanghai to Guilin derailed here due to landslides damaging the track. 
On 26 May 2011, three explosions struck government buildings. Two people were killed and at least six injured in the blasts. The cause of the blasts is being investigated.

Famous people
Fuzhou is historically important as the home (specifically Linchuan) of Wang Anshi, the famous reformist prime minister of Song Dynasty, Zeng Gong, an influential scholar and historian of the Song Dynasty, and Tang Xianzu, the great Ming Dynasty dramatist. Chinese neurobiologist Rao Yi was born in Nancheng County of Fuzhou, Jiangxi province. Longtime backup People's Liberation Army Astronaut Corps taikonaut Deng Qingming who finally flew on Shenzhou 15 after 24 years of waiting was born in Yihuang County of Fuzhou, Jiangxi province.

External links
 (Chinese) Official Website

References

 
Cities in Jiangxi
Prefecture-level divisions of Jiangxi